Gumshoe is a 1971 British black comedy film that was the cinematic directorial debut of director Stephen Frears. Written by local author Neville Smith, who appears as Arthur, the film is set in Liverpool. Albert Finney plays the role of Eddie Ginley, a bingo-caller and occasional club comedian who dreams of being a private eye of the kind he knows from films and pulp novels. Having put an advertisement in a local newspaper (the Liverpool Echo) as a birthday present to himself, Ginley is suddenly contacted for what appears to be an actual piece of detective work.

Plot
Eddie Ginley works at a bingo hall in Liverpool, England, but dreams of becoming a stylish private investigator like those he has read about and seen in films. After finally placing an advertisement in a local newspaper announcing his detective services, he receives a mysterious offer. Even though Ginley is inexperienced and clueless at certain aspects of investigating, he comes to realize that he is entangled in a serious case involving drugs, murder and even his own family.

Cast

Production
The film has many comic moments as it switches between 'straight' detective novel and affectionate spoof. It has some shots of Liverpool buildings that have long since been demolished, including the employment exchange on Leece Street. Several scenes in the London part of the narrative take place in and around the occult Atlantis Bookshop.

Gumshoe was the first of two films with original music scores by Andrew Lloyd Webber (the other was The Odessa File, in 1974). Some of the music used was originally written for Lloyd Webber's then-abandoned musical version of Sunset Boulevard; the music was restored to its original place when work on the musical was resumed years later. Roy Young recorded the song "Baby, You're Good For Me", written by Lloyd Webber and Tim Rice.

A scene was significantly (and clumsily) shortened before release because of its detailed depiction of a heroin user preparing and taking his "fix". After years of unavailability, Gumshoe was released on DVD in 2009.

References

External links
 

1971 films
1970s crime comedy-drama films
British chase films
British crime comedy-drama films
1970s chase films
Columbia Pictures films
1970s English-language films
Films directed by Stephen Frears
Films set in Liverpool
Films set in London
British neo-noir films
1971 directorial debut films
1971 comedy films
1971 drama films
1970s British films